M01 is a Ukraine international highway (M-highway) that stretches from the state capital, Kyiv, to the northern border with Belarus.

Together with the M05 it is a part of the European routes E95 (Saint Petersburg – Kyiv – Odessa  Samsun – Merzifon) and the Trans-European transportation corridor IX. Also together with the M02 it is part of E101 (Kyiv – Moscow).

Route / Junctions

Its southern end is in Kyiv at intersection of Academician Hlushkov Parkway (Akademika Hlushkova Avenue) and Academician Zabolotny Parkway (Akademika Zabolotnoho Avenue). 

Coming through the city of Kyiv it crosses Dnipro at Paton's bridge and continuing towards Brovary Parkway by Voziednannya Parkway. Coming from there the highway goes around Brovary (one branch goes through the city and rejoins the route), then goes around Kozelets crossing a river and continuing north. Not far north from Kozelets  splits north of Kipti traveling east by Highway , while  continues north towards Chernihiv. Near village of Yahidne, south of Chernihiv,  spurs with one branch and  going west and then north around Chernihiv crossing another river; and second branch continues without deviation through the city, crossing the same river as the main route and after 13.7 km rejoins it north of Chernihiv. Shortly after Chernihiv  goes right through the village of Ripky with numerous private homes located close to the road. After Ripky the next important settlement is Novi Yarylovychi that is located just south of the border with Belarus.
The section from Kyiv to Chernihiv is a dual carriageway, from Chernihiv it continues as a single carriageway.

Repairs
Repairs to the highway in Ukraine have started in 2007 and are planned to be finished before UEFA Euro 2012.

See also

 Ukraine Highways
 International E-road network
 Pan-European corridors

Notes

References

External links
 Highways in Ukraine — Автодороги Украины.(russian lang.) Information about highways, motorways, regional roads in Ukraine.
 International Roads in Ukraine in Russian
 European Roads in Russian
 List of automobile roads, Declaration of the Cabinet of Ministers of Ukraine

European route E95
Roads in Kyiv
Roads in Kyiv Oblast
Roads in Chernihiv Oblast